Demetria Jean Sance (born August 30, 1977) is a former indoor volleyball player. She played for the University of Texas at Austin and the United States women's national team.

Career
Sance played volleyball at Texas from 1995 to 1998. In her first season, she was named the National Freshman of the Year. She went on to earn All-Conference and NCAA Regional All-Tournament honors during all four years at Texas. She set 21 school records, including most career kills, attacks, and digs.

After college, Sance joined the U.S. national team and played in the 2000 Summer Olympics. She later served as head coach of the Wagner High School volleyball team.

In 2003, Sance was admitted to the San Antonio Sports Hall of Fame.

Personal
Sance was born on August 19, 1977 in San Antonio. She is 5 feet, 11 inches tall.

References

1977 births
Living people
Olympic volleyball players of the United States
Volleyball players at the 2000 Summer Olympics
Texas Longhorns women's volleyball players
Sportspeople from San Antonio
American women's volleyball players
African-American volleyball players
21st-century African-American sportspeople
21st-century African-American women
20th-century African-American sportspeople
20th-century African-American women
20th-century African-American people
Pan American Games medalists in volleyball
Pan American Games bronze medalists for the United States
Medalists at the 1999 Pan American Games